The Robert Boyle Lecture is a lecture series delivered to the Oxford University Scientific Club (formerly the Oxford University Junior Scientific Club) at the University of Oxford, England. The first lecture was delivered in 1892.

The lectures
 1 - The place in science and the character of Robert Boyle
 2 - Molecular Tactics of a Crystal
 5 - Argon and Helium, the Two Recently Discovered Gases
 8 - Magnetism in Growth
 9 - The rise of the experimental method in Oxford
 13 - The Pressure of Light
 14 - The Scope and Importance to the State of the Science of National Eugenics
 17 - The Fertility of the Soil
 18 - The Growth of a Crystal
 21 - Nationality and Race (delivered by Arthur Keith)
 22 - Anthropology and history
 23 - Electrons and Ether Waves
 27 - The Geological Age of the Earth
 28 - Recent Developments in Atomic Theory
 33 - The Problems of Specificity in Biochemical Catalysis
 39 - The structure of alloys
 49 - Anatomical pattern as the essential basis of sensory discrimination
 50 - Science and International Relations
 53 - A Hundred Years of Spectroscopy...

Lecturers 
In 1998, the lecture was presented by Kevin Warwick.

References 

Boyle
Recurring events established in 1892
Lists of events